172 and 174 Baker Street is a grade II listed house in Enfield, London. Number 172 is a former shop and part of the brick built house while number 174 comprises the rest of the house. The shop was used by the National Deposit Friendly Society and had a door facing the street until recent times. The weatherboarding is modern.

References

Enfield, London
Grade II listed houses in London
Grade II listed buildings in the London Borough of Enfield
Houses in the London Borough of Enfield